Frederick J. Tenuto (born January 20, 1915) was a New York City mobster and criminal who was on the FBI's Ten Most Wanted list for over a decade, the longest on record at the time. As Top Ten fugitive number 14 he replaced Stephen William Davenport, #12, as the first replacement of a fugitive who was not among the original ten.

Background
Tenuto was born in Philadelphia, Pennsylvania on January 20, 1915. 

A low level criminal, Tenuto escaped from the  Philadelphia County Prison in a jailbreak with four other inmates including bank robber Willie "The Actor" Sutton on February 10, 1947. Eluding authorities for several years, Sutton was eventually identified in early 1952 while riding in a New York City Subway train by Brooklyn resident Arnold Schuster. After Schuster was murdered following a television interview, authorities suspected Tenuto of the killing (supposedly on the orders of New York mobster Albert Anastasia), who had been officially placed on the FBI's Ten Most Wanted list on May 24, 1950, and was never captured.

Tenuto's name remained on the FBI's Most Wanted list for over 14 years. It was removed on March 9, 1964, amid reports Tenuto had been killed and secretly buried.

See also 
 List of fugitives from justice who disappeared

References

Further reading
Davis, John H. Mafia Dynasty: The Rise and Fall of the Gambino Crime Family. New York: HarperCollins, 1993.
Turner, William W. Hoover's FBI. New York: Thunder's Mouth Press, 1993.

External links
Prison Breaks: Convicts and Escapes-Breaching prison Walls, Inmates Tunnel Out of Historical Prison - About Frederick Tenuto

1915 births
Possibly living people
American escapees
American gangsters of Italian descent
FBI Ten Most Wanted Fugitives
Missing gangsters
People from Philadelphia